Cholesterol sulfate, or cholest-5-en-3β-ol sulfate, is an endogenous steroid and the C3β sulfate ester of cholesterol. It is formed from cholesterol by steroid sulfotransferases (SSTs) such as SULT2B1b (also known as cholesterol sulfotransferase) and is converted back into cholesterol by steroid sulfatase (STS). Accumulation of cholesterol sulfate in the skin is implicated in the pathophysiology of X-linked ichthyosis, a congenital disorder in which STS is non-functional and the body cannot convert cholesterol sulfate back into cholesterol.

See also
 Steroid sulfate

References

Cholestanes
Steroid esters
Sulfate esters